What A Way To Go: Life at the End of Empire is a 2007 documentary film written, directed and narrated by Timothy S. Bennett.

It discusses issues such as peak oil, climate change and the effects of global warming, population overshoot and species extinction, as well as how this situation has developed. The documentary features supporting data and interviews of Daniel Quinn, environmental activist Derrick Jensen and academics such as Richard Heinberg and many others.

The tagline of the documentary is, "A middle-class white guy comes to grips with Peak Oil, Climate Change, Mass Extinction, Population Overshoot and the demise of the American lifestyle."

See also
Holocene extinction
Extinction debt

References

External links 
 Review on The Social Contract Press
 "Meet the Filmmakers", interview of Sally Erickson and Tim Bennett
 
 "What a Way to Go: Life at the End of Empire" at www.cultureunplugged.com

2007 films
2007 in the environment
Anti-modernist films
Documentary films about global warming
Documentary films about peak oil
Documentary films about politics
Documentary films about environmental issues
2007 documentary films